Johnson v. United States may refer to the following opinions of the Supreme Court of the United States:

Johnson v. United States (1895), 157 U.S. 320 (1895), an 1895 opinion
Johnson v. United States (1896), 160 U.S. 546 (1896), an 1896 opinion
Johnson v. United States (1948 Fourth Amendment case), 333 U.S. 10 (1948), a 1948 opinion involving the requirement for a search warrant under the Fourth Amendment
Johnson v. United States (1948 b), 333 U.S. 46 (1948), a 1948 opinion involving the liability of a shipowner for an accident
Johnson v. United States (2000), 529 U.S. 694 (2000), involving the rights of those serving federal probation and supervised release
Johnson v. United States (2005), 544 U.S. 295 (2005), an opinion of the 2004 term, involving the statute of limitations under the Antiterrorism and Effective Death Penalty Act of 1996 for prisoners seeking to modify their federal sentence
Johnson v. United States (2010), 559 U.S. 133 (2010), a decision involving the Armed Career Criminal Act
Johnson v. United States (2015), 576 U.S. ___ (2015), involving the constitutionality of the residual clause of the Armed Career Criminal Act

See also
United States v. Johnson (disambiguation)